Kaffir or Kafir may refer to:

Ethnicity and religion
Kafir, an Arabic term for an infidel
Kaffir (racial term), an ethnic slur used in South Africa
The Nuristani people, an ethnic group of Pakistan and Afghanistan
Sri Lanka Kaffir people, an ethnic group

Languages
Fanagalo, a Zulu-based pidgin language once referred to as Kitchen Kaffir
Sri Lanka Kaffir language, a creole spoken by that people
Kafiiri or Kafiristani, terms for the Nuristani languages of the Hindu Kush

Places 
Kaffraria or British Kaffraria, a former designation for King William's Town and East London, South Africa
Kafir, Idlib, a village in Syria
Kafiristan, the historic name for the Nuristan Province in Afghanistan
Kaffrine, a city in Senegal

Plants
Kaffir lime, a variety of lime fruit native to Indonesia also known as a makrut lime
Kaffir lily (disambiguation), one of two flowers found in southern Africa:
Clivia miniata
Hesperantha coccinea
Kafir, kaffir or kaffircorn, another name for the grain sorghum
 Kaffir boom (Erythrina lysistemon), a species of tree in the family Fabaceae

Other uses
Kaafir (Pakistani TV series), a 2011 television series
Kaafir (Indian TV series), a 2019 Indian web television series
Kafir harp 
Sunbeam Kaffir, an engine built by the Sunbeam car company
African wildcat, formerly known as the Kaffir cat

See also
Kefir, fermented milk drink
Cafres
Tibicos, a fermented beverage known as water kefir